Sandra Christine Nori (born 16 June 1953 in Newcastle, New South Wales) is a former Australian politician and presently a company director and Member of Macquarie University Council.

Nori was a member of the New South Wales Legislative Assembly representing the electoral districts of McKell (1988–1991) and Port Jackson (1991–2007) for the Labor Party. She served in a range of ministerial portfolios between 1999 and 2007. Since leaving politics, Nori has been appointed to a number of roles as a non-executive director.

Early years and background
Nori was born in Newcastle, of Italian parents. She was educated at Petersham Girls High School and University of Sydney, graduating with a Bachelor of Economics. Nori was formerly married to Senator John Faulkner and together they have two children.

Parliamentary career
A member of the Australian Labor Party, Nori represented two electorates successively: the newly created electorate of McKell between 1988 and 1991 (which was abolished at the 1991 state election; and the newly created electorate of Port Jackson between 1991 and 2007 (which was again abolished at the 2007 state election).

In the battle for re-election as the Member for McKell at the 1988 state election, Nori defeated independent candidate, Frank Sartor. Sartor went on to join the Labor Party, represent the electorate of Rockdale, and become a senior Labor minister.

She was Minister for Small Business from April 1999 to April 2003, and was Minister for Tourism (later Tourism and Sport and Recreation) from April 1999 and Minister for Women from 2002 until her retirement from parliament in March 2007.

Personal life
In the 1990s Nori was in a personal relationship with Paul Gibson, who was at that time Labor member for Londonderry. In 2007 it was alleged that Gibson had assaulted her. A subsequent police investigation found insufficient evidence to lay charges.

Career after leaving New South Wales parliament
In 2008, Nori was appointed to the Council of Macquarie University and also serves on the boards of the NSW TAFE Commission, Domain Resorts and Residences, and Komosion, a digital marketing and website publishing software company.

Nori is also a Member of the Board of Advisors of the Global Panel Foundation, a non-government organisation that works behind the scenes in crisis areas around the world.

Sandra was appointed in 2011 to the National Board of the Duke of Edinburgh's International Award - Australia and was up to 2021 its National Deputy Chair.

Honours
Silver Distinguished Service Medal, The Duke of Edinburgh's International Award - Australia (2017) recognising her substantial services to youth, especially regional and disadvantaged young Australians.
Gold Distinguished Service Medal, The Duke of Edinburgh's International Award – Australia (2021)

References

 

Members of the New South Wales Legislative Assembly
1953 births
Living people
Australian politicians of Italian descent
Labor Left politicians
Australian Labor Party members of the Parliament of New South Wales
21st-century Australian politicians
21st-century Australian women politicians
Women members of the New South Wales Legislative Assembly